Lilo & Stitch, also marketed as Stitch, is a Disney media franchise that commenced in 2002 with the release of the animated film of the same name written and directed by Chris Sanders and Dean DeBlois. The combined critical and commercial success of the original film, which was a rarity for the company's feature animation studio during the early 2000s, led to three direct-to-video and television sequel feature films, a short film, three animated television series, several video games, theme park attractions, and various merchandise.

The franchise, primarily the original 2002–2006 animated continuity, mainly focuses on the adventures of the titular eccentric and mischievous duo; an orphaned Hawaiian girl named Lilo Pelekai (voiced in most media by Daveigh Chase) and an artificial extraterrestrial creature originally named Experiment 626, whom she adopts and names Stitch (voiced by Chris Sanders in Western media and select Disney video games). Stitch was originally genetically-engineered by alien mad scientist Dr. Jumba Jookiba (voiced by David Ogden Stiers from 2002 to 2006 and in the 2010 video game Kingdom Hearts Birth by Sleep) to cause chaos and destruction across the galaxy, but was rehabilitated by Lilo thanks to the Hawaiian concept of ohana, or family. The duo's ohana mainly consist of themselves, Lilo's older sister and legal guardian Nani Pelekai (voiced by Tia Carrere), Jumba, and Jumba's Earth-loving partner Agent Wendy Pleakley (voiced by Kevin McDonald in Western media). Most of the sequel and spin-off material of the franchise also involve many genetic experiments similar to Stitch, who he treats as his "cousins", Captain Gantu (voiced by Kevin Michael Richardson in Western media), a giant militaristic alien from the original film who becomes an antagonist to the main ohana in later works, and Dr. Jacques von Hämsterviel (voiced by Jeff Bennett in Western media), Jumba's diminutive former partner-in-crime who desires the experiments he funded the creation of to use them for intergalactic domination. Additionally, the franchise's films and first television series made frequent references to American musician Elvis Presley, using his music and sometimes his imagery in the films.

The later spin-off material released after 2006—the Japanese anime Stitch!, the Chinese animated series Stitch & Ai, and Japanese manga Stitch & the Samurai—emphasize Stitch by separating him from Lilo and putting him into other regions of Earth (primarily in the countries where these works are produced), replacing her with different humans who take him, along with Jumba and Pleakley, in with their families. The anime was produced by an entirely different crew from the original franchise, while the Chinese series was partially produced by American animators, including those who worked on Lilo & Stitch: The Series. The anime and the Chinese series replaced the original voice cast of the four films and the first TV series, with Benjamin Diskin and Lilo & Stitch: The Series executive producer and screenwriter Jess Winfield respectively voicing Stitch and Jumba in both shows. Stitch & the Samurai was written and illustrated by Hiroto Wada. A live-action/CGI remake of the original film is in development.

Films and television

Overviews

Films

Television series

Main continuity

Lilo & Stitch (2002) 

The 42nd Disney animated feature film. An extraterrestrial mad scientist named Dr. Jumba Jookiba (voiced by David Ogden Stiers) is put on trial for illegally creating creatures to cause chaos and destruction. His latest experiment is Experiment 626 (Chris Sanders): a little blue alien with four arms, two legs, and antennae who is deceptively strong and indestructible. 626 (pronounced "six-two-six") is sentenced to exile, while Jumba himself is jailed. However, 626 escapes custody, steals a police cruiser ship, and heads to the planet Earth. Jumba gets sent on a mission to retrieve his creation along with a partner on board, self-proclaimed Earth expert Agent Pleakley (Kevin McDonald), who is forced to go along to keep an eye on him.

Masquerading as a dog, 626 is adopted by a little girl named Lilo Pelekai (Daveigh Chase) who is living with her 19-year-old sister Nani (Tia Carrere). Lilo is lonely and a bit of an outcast until she finds a new friend in 626 whom she names "Stitch".

Stitch! The Movie (2003) 

Ex-Captain Gantu (Kevin Michael Richardson) is hired by the evil Dr. Hämsterviel (Jeff Bennett) to retrieve the remaining 625 experiments. Meanwhile, on Earth, Stitch is still not fitting in, but when trouble comes calling through the form of Experiment 221 (Frank Welker), he and Lilo must band together to stop his electrical rampage. Meanwhile, Gantu ends up with a new ally, Experiment 625 (Rob Paulsen), but is displeased by his lazy behavior and love of sandwiches.

Lilo & Stitch: The Series (2003–2006) 

Continuing where Stitch! The Movie left off, Lilo and Stitch are given the task of collecting the rest of Jumba's missing experiments, changing them from bad to good, and finding the one place where they truly belong. Meanwhile, the former Captain Gantu and his reluctant partner, Experiment 625, try to capture the experiments for the imprisoned Dr. Hämsterviel.

Running for a total of 65 episodes over two seasons, The Series ended with the television film Leroy & Stitch.

Lilo & Stitch 2: Stitch Has a Glitch (2005) 

Set at a time between the original film and Stitch! The Movie, Lilo (voiced by Dakota Fanning in this film) and her classmates are preparing for a hula competition where the winner gets to perform at the local May Day festival. Each student is required to create an original dance. While preparing for the competition, Stitch's past comes back to haunt him. It seems that after Stitch was created, Jumba did not get a chance to fully charge Stitch's molecules before they were both arrested. At first, this glitch causes Stitch to revert to his old destructive programming, but it will ultimately destroy him if Jumba cannot create a charging pod before Stitch's energy runs out.

The Origin of Stitch (2005) 

In this short film included on the Lilo & Stitch 2 DVD, serving as a bridge between it and Stitch! The Movie, Stitch discovers Jumba's computer and is scared to find out what a monster he is, only for Jumba to come and explain how he found family and love when he met Lilo. The other experiments are also hinted at.

Leroy & Stitch (2006) 

After three years, their mission to capture all 624 experiments and repurpose them on Earth has been completed, so Lilo and her family are honored as heroes by the Galactic Alliance. Despite originally turning down their new offered positions to stay with Lilo, Stitch and the crew separate to live out their ambitions. However, after Gantu frees Hämsterviel from his prison, they create a new experiment of their own, Leroy (Chris Sanders). Lilo and Stitch must reunite and unite every single experiment they have to fight Leroy and his army of duplicated clones.

Spin-off releases

"Stitch Meets High School Musical" (2007) 
Stitch and a number of Lilo & Stitch characters play a friendly game of basketball and then dance to "We're All in This Together" from High School Musical. This anime short aired on Disney Channel Japan on June 18, 2007 and was later released internationally on September 23, 2008 on the High School Musical 2: Deluxe Dance Edition 2-disc DVD set.

Stitch! (2008–2015) 

The anime series features a Japanese girl named Yuna Kamihara (voiced by Eden Riegel in the English dub) in place of Lilo, and is set on a fictional island off the shore of Okinawa instead of Hawaii. The first two seasons were animated and co-produced by the Japanese animation house Madhouse, while the third season and two post-series television specials were animated by Shin-Ei Animation. 86 episodes (including three specials) were made from 2008 to 2011, while two post-series specials were released in 2012 and 2015.

Set years after the events of Leroy & Stitch, the anime sees Stitch (now voiced by Ben Diskin) having left Lilo after she went to college. He ends up on the fictitious Izayoi Island where he meets Yuna, a tomboyish girl who lives with her grandmother (Gwendoline Yeo) and practices karate. Stitch befriends Yuna, Jumba (Jess Winfield) and Pleakley (Ted Biaselli) later rejoin Stitch, and the three aliens move in with Yuna's family. In the first two seasons, Stitch tries to do 43 good deeds to appease the Chitama Spiritual Stone, a magical stone that can grant wishes, with Stitch wanting to become the strongest being in the universe. He and Yuna also meets various yōkai, with them befriending Kijimunaa (Colleen O'Shaughnessey), a little yōkai with long red hair who has a powerful sneeze. Meanwhile, Hämsterviel (Kirk Thornton), who is at large along with Gantu (Keith Silverstein) and Experiment 625/Reuben (Dave Wittenberg), wants to defeat Stitch and take his good deeds to gain ultimate power.

The first season sees Stitch doing good deeds while enjoying his new life with Yuna on Izayoi, with them befriending various yōkai. Three of Stitch and Reuben's fellow experiments also make appearances, namely Experiment 221/Sparky, Experiment 010/Felix (both Steve Blum), and Experiment 624/Angel (Kate Higgins), the last of whom becomes a more recurring character compared to Lilo & Stitch: The Series and has—since her last Western appearance in Leroy & Stitch—remained Stitch's girlfriend while also having become a popular singing sensation in the years since.

The second season, titled Stitch! ~The Mischievous Alien's Great Adventure~, sees Stitch continuing to live his life with Yuna and completing his goal of doing good deeds for his wish to be granted. More characters join the cast during this season, including BooGoo (Blum), a purple insect-like alien who becomes the aliens' new pet, Sasha (Melissa Fahn), a transfer student who becomes Yuna's newest friend, and Tigerlily Sakai (Laura Bailey), Yuna's beautiful but mean cousin who bullies her and Stitch. Additionally, more experiments, both originating from Lilo & Stitch: The Series and newly introduced to the franchise, appear from this season onward, with most of them now inexplicably under Hämsterviel's possession. By the end of this season, however, Stitch loses his motivation to have his wish granted, deciding that living with Yuna is better than being the strongest in the universe.

In the third season, titled Stitch! ~Best Friends Forever~, Yuna, Stitch, Tigerlily, Jumba, Pleakley, and BooGoo move to a city called Okinawa New Town. Meanwhile, Hämsterviel partners with an alien woman named Delia (Mary Elizabeth McGlynn), who desires to retrieve a power cell within Stitch, eventually making a powerful experiment of her own—Dark End (Roger Craig Smith)—to do so. Lilo (Yeo) also returns in one episode of this season for a brief reunion with Stitch.

Stitch & Ai (2017) 

Taking place in Huangshan in Anhui, this 13-episode Chinese animated series stars Stitch (voiced by Ben Diskin in the English version, reprising his anime role) and a local girl named Wang Ai Ling (Erica Mendez). Produced in English with the partnership of American animators, the series was animated by Anhui Xinhua Media and Panimation Hwakai Media and was broadcast on CCTV-14 with a Mandarin Chinese dub from March 27 to April 6, 2017. The original English version later aired in Southeast Asia in February 2018 and released in the United States on the DisneyNow service on December 1, 2018, streaming on the service until June 2019.

Set after Leroy & Stitch but on a separate timeline from the Stitch! anime, the Chinese series shows Stitch having been captured by a warring alien faction called the Jaboodies who wants to use him as their own destructive genetic experiment, but he escapes when a rival faction also wanting him, the Woolagongs, attacks the ship he was held in. Ending up in the Huangshan mountains, Stitch meets Ai, a spirited girl whose aunt Daiyu (Laura Post) wants to move Ai from her sister Jiejie (Post) and their mountain home to a city. Stitch joins Ai's family as her new "dog", with Jumba (Jess Winfield, also reprising his role from the anime) and Pleakley (Lucien Dodge) also joining them after initially being sent to rescue Stitch. Stitch helps Ai stay in the mountains and she helps him ward off the Jaboodies and the Woolagongs, both of whom desire to make use of a secret metamorphosis ability Jumba programmed in Stitch that turns the experiment into a destructive giant.

Live action adaptation

In October 2018, Walt Disney Pictures announced that a live-action adaptation of Lilo & Stitch was in development. With a script written by Mike Van Waes, Dan Lin and Jonathan Eirich were announced as producers. In November 2020, Jon M. Chu entered early negotiations to serve as director on the project. Filming was announced to take place in Hawaii, while Van Waes's script was rejected by Disney. In July 2022, Dean Fleischer Camp (Marcel the Shell with Shoes On) signed on to replace Chu as the film's director. Chris Kekaniokalani Bright, a Hawaiian-born-and-based writer whose script Conviction made the 2018 edition of the Black List, will write the film's script. Zach Galifianakis will star in an undisclosed role.

Cast and characters

Crew

Comics

Comic Zone: Lilo & Stitch
From 2002 to 2006, Disney Adventures released a number of comic strip tie-ins to the franchise. These include prequel comics set before the original film (which include the first appearances of later major character Experiment 625/Reuben, who has a teal coloration in these comics), additional comics set around the time of the film, comics set during the events of Lilo & Stitch: The Series, comics set around the time of Lilo & Stitch 2: Stitch Has a Glitch, and comics set during the events of Leroy & Stitch. On March 7, 2006, Disney Press published a collection of Lilo & Stitch comic strips that were originally published from 2002 to 2005 as Comic Zone, Volume 1: Disney's Lilo & Stitch, the first of four volumes compiling various strips that featured in the "Comic Zone" section of Disney Adventures.

Stitch & the Samurai (2020)

It takes place in an alternate universe where Stitch crash lands in Japan during the Sengoku period and gets taken in by a warlord named , who finds the "blue tanuki" to be cute. Throughout 2021, an official English translation of the manga's three tankōbon were published by Tokyopop.

The manga's art style is a combination of hyper-realistically drawn humans and environments as featured in other historical manga with the cartoonish design of Stitch and related characters and elements maintained from past franchise entries, with short animations added on some panels. Aside from taking place in Earth's past instead of the modern day, the manga also deviates from past franchise entries by having Stitch's human companion be an adult male rather than a young girl.

Literature

Agent Stitch (2022–present)

Agent Stitch is a children's book series written by American author Steve Behling and illustrated by Italian artist Arianna Rea. It is the first major Western-produced work in the franchise since Leroy & Stitch (2006). The book series takes place on an alternate timeline after the original film, with Stitch becoming a detective for the United Galactic Federation as part of the Galactic Detective Agency to investigate extraterrestrial-related mysteries happening in various Earth cities, such as Paris and New York City. The first book, A Study in Slime, was published on August 16, 2022, while the second book, The Trouble with Toothoids, is slated to be published on May 30, 2023.

Video games

Disney's Lilo & Stitch (Game Boy Advance; 2002) 

Disney's Lilo & Stitch is a 2002 side-scrolling shoot 'em up platform video game based on the original film that was developed by Digital Eclipse for the Game Boy Advance.

Disney's Lilo & Stitch: Trouble in Paradise (2002)

Disney's Lilo & Stitch: Trouble in Paradise (titled simply Disney's Lilo & Stitch on the American release of the PlayStation version) is a platform video game developed by Blitz Games for PlayStation and Microsoft Windows that was released on June 14, 2002.

Disney's Stitch: Experiment 626 (2002)

Disney's Stitch: Experiment 626 is a platform game for the PlayStation 2 on June 19, 2002, and serves as a prequel to the original film Lilo & Stitch, although it was retconned from the franchise's chronology by Lilo & Stitch 2: Stitch Has a Glitch.

Lilo & Stitch: Hawaiian Adventure (2002)
Disney's Lilo & Stitch: Hawaiian Adventure (released in some countries as Disney's Lilo & Stitch: Hawaiian Discovery) is a video game developed by Gorilla Systems Corporation and published by Disney Interactive on June 22, 2002, consisting of various minigames, similar to Disney's Activity Center series. AllGame rated 3/5 stars, writing: "Less like an adventure game and more like a series of arcade games, there's enough entertainment on hand to get to the three-game finale".

Lilo & Stitch Pinball (2002)
Disney's Lilo & Stitch Pinball is a pinball video game developed by Buzz Monkey Software and published by Disney Interactive for Microsoft Windows. It was released on October 8, 2002.

Lilo & Stitch 2: Hämsterviel Havoc (2004)

Disney's Lilo & Stitch 2: Hämsterviel Havoc (titled simply Disney's Lilo & Stitch 2 in Europe and Disney's Lilo and Stitch in Japan) is an action-platform game developed by Climax Studios and published by Disney Interactive Studios for Game Boy Advance on October 12, 2004. Hämsterviel Havoc is the sole tie-in game for Lilo & Stitch: The Series and a standalone sequel to the Lilo & Stitch game released on the same platform in 2002. While the game is primarily a platform game, the player has the chance to play as other characters and vehicle segments. The game was met with average to mixed reception, as GameRankings gave it 71.67% based on 6 reviews, while Metacritic gave it 66 out of 100 based on 4 reviews.

Disney Stitch Jam (2009)

The first video game based on the Stitch! anime series, it was released in Japan on December 3, 2009, in North America on March 23, 2010, and in Europe on March 26. Different from past Lilo & Stitch adaptations, Disney Stitch Jam has players taking control of Stitch and some of his cousins in a variety of missions set in space, out on the seas, and in a variety of areas by touching musical notes and exclamation marks. In the game's story, Angel (X-624) gets kidnapped by Gantu and Hämsterviel, and Stitch has to rescue her by traveling into ten worlds. Stitch is the main playable character, while Angel, Reuben (X-625) and Felix (X-010) are unlockable.

NGamer gave the game a review score of 44% in their May 2010 issue. Common Sense Media's Chad Sapieha gave the game 4 out of 5 stars, calling the gameplay "polished and fun", and praising the game's visuals and sound, but criticizing the game's short length. On release week, Famitsu scored the game a 28 out of 40 across all four reviews.

Motto! Stitch! DS: Rhythm de Rakugaki Daisakusen (2010)

, is a rhythm video game and a sequel to Disney Stitch Jam. It was developed by Cattle Call (the developer of the first game) and published by Disney Interactive Studios. Like the first game, it is also based on the Stitch! anime series, although this game is based on the show's third season, Stitch! ~Best Friends Forever~. It was released in Japan on November 18, 2010. This game was not released in North America or Europe.

This game has the same gameplay as its prequel, Disney Stitch Jam, and has more new features, characters, and experiments. This game is a modified engine of its prequel. Players can enjoy the rhythmic action of Stitch, who has a magic microphone that can draw his drawings on the air for decorations and traveling (which resembles and is a parody of Doraemon's secret tool, "Air Crayon"). Players can also dress up characters like Stitch and Angel. On release week, Famitsu scored the game a 30 out of 40 across all four reviews.

Bomberman: Disney Stitch Edition (2010)
 is a spin-off of the Bomberman franchise for the i-mode mobile internet platform developed by Hudson Soft and distributed by D2 Communications. Based on Stitch!, it was released for free under the DoCo DeMo Game banner in 2010 exclusively in Japan.

Other appearances
 A 2004 EyeToy party game called Disney Move included a Lilo & Stitch-themed minigame.
 The franchise has been used in the Kingdom Hearts series:
 In Kingdom Hearts II (2005) and III (2019), Stitch may be summoned alongside Sora to aid him in battles.
 Kingdom Hearts Birth by Sleep (2010) features characters and the outer space environment from the franchise.
 In Disney Friends (2007), players can voice and touch to control the actions and emotional behaviors of the game's characters, which includes Stitch.
 In Disney Universe (2011), Stitch costumes are available in the game.
 Stitch appears in the Tomorrowland area of Disneyland in Kinect: Disneyland Adventures (2011) as a meet-and-greet character, and like other characters in the game, he gives the player character quests to complete.
 Lilo & Stitch is referenced in the Disney Infinity series (2013–2016):
 In the first game (2013), two Lilo & Stitch-themed power discs were released in which players can use Stitch's plasma blasters and the "Hangin' Ten Stitch with Surfboard", a hoverboard with a miniature Stitch figure in front.
 In Disney Infinity 2.0 (2014), Stitch is a playable character, while the Lilo & Stitch franchise is tied into a Toy Box Expansion Game; a tower defense titled Stitch's Tropical Rescue, which features Agent Pleakley in cutscenes and voice-over. Several in-game toys related to the franchise were also added to the game series. He is part of the non-Marvel 2.0 Edition Toy Box starter pack, alongside Merida from Pixar's Brave. As with other playable characters in the series, Stitch can also be used in Disney Infinity 3.0 (2015).
 Both title characters of the franchise appear in the Nintendo 3DS life simulation game Disney Magical World (2013) and its sequel (2015), with the latter game also featuring Jumba, Pleakley, and a world based on the franchise.
 In an April 2017 update to Disney Crossy Road, Lilo & Stitch became a playable world. Over fifteen original film characters are featured in the game.
 In an April 2018 update to the Gameloft mobile and computer game Disney Magic Kingdoms, seven Lilo & Stitch characters (Lilo, Stitch, Nani, Jumba, Pleakley, Cobra Bubbles, and Angel), several attractions based on franchise-related locations and other elements were added to the game as part of a limited time event. The event features an original storyline based on the films and Lilo & Stitch: The Series that involves the Lilo & Stitch characters.
 In Disney Dreamlight Valley, Stitch (who was added in a December 2022 update during the game's early access period) appears as one of the villagers of the titular Dreamlight Valley. It's revealed after completing a series of quests that takes ten days to complete that he fled the valley during "the Forgetting" to find help. After he returns to the valley, he resides in a house that resembles his and Lilo's bedroom dome on the outside but resembles a condensed version of the Pelekais' home on the inside. Various Lilo & Stitch-themed furniture, clothing motifs, and other items can also be unlocked.

Theme park attractions
Various Lilo & Stitch-themed attractions have opened in Disney theme parks.

Stitch's Great Escape!
Stitch's Great Escape! was a "theatre in the round" show that opened on November 16, 2004, in Magic Kingdom at the Walt Disney World Resort as a replacement for the ExtraTERRORestrial Alien Encounter. It last operated on January 6, 2018, and confirmed by Disney officials to be closed on July 16, 2020.

Stitch's Supersonic Celebration
Stitch's Supersonic Celebration was a short-lived stage show that ran from May 6, 2009, to June 27, 2009, at Magic Kingdom at the Walt Disney World Resort.

Stitch Encounter
Stitch Encounter is an interactive show similar to Turtle Talk with Crush that opened in 2006 at Hong Kong Disneyland at the Hong Kong Disneyland Resort. Other versions of the attraction opened Walt Disney Studios Park at Disneyland Paris (as Stitch Live!) in 2008, Tokyo Disneyland at Tokyo Disney Resort in Spring 2015, and Shanghai Disneyland Park at Shanghai Disney Resort in 2016. The original version in Hong Kong closed in 2016, and no versions of this attraction have ever opened at either American Disney resort.

The Enchanted Tiki Room: Stitch Presents Aloha e Komo Mai!
The Enchanted Tiki Room: Stitch Presents Aloha e Komo Mai! is a "theatre in the round" Audio-Animatronics show that opened in 2008 in Tokyo Disneyland at Tokyo Disney Resort, and is the fourth incarnation of The Enchanted Tiki Room.

Reception
The original Lilo & Stitch film received positive critical reviews, while the direct-to-video and television sequels received mixed to negative reception.

Notes

References

External links 

 
Animated film series
Animated science fiction films
Comedy film franchises
Science fiction film franchises
Children's film series
Disney animated film series
Walt Disney Studios (division) franchises
Extraterrestrial life in popular culture
Film series introduced in 2002
Mass media franchises introduced in 2002